Domingo Alberto Tarasconi (20 December 1903 – 3 July 1991) was an Argentine football forward. Raising from Club Atlético Atlanta, he played most of his career for Boca Juniors where he won 9 official titles and became the all-time 4th. He was also a top scorer in the history of the club behind Martín Palermo, Roberto Cherro, and Francisco Varallo.

Apart from those achievements with the club, Tarasconi was Primera División topscorer on five occasions between 1922 and 1934, being also one of the all-time top scorers in the league, having scored 208 goals in 289 matches between 1921 and 1934.

Tarasconi also played for the Argentina national football team, winning the silver medal and being topscorer of the Summer Olympics held in Amsterdam in 1928 with 11 goals in 4 matches. His outstanding performance in the competition still holds a record. With Argentina, he also won two Copa América titles in 1925, and 1929.

Tarasconi was also mentioned in the tango Patadura, released in 1928 and performed by legend Carlos Gardel.

Career 

Tarasconi's first steps in football were in Atlanta, where he debuted in 1921. One season later he moved to Boca Juniors where he became one of the all-time top scorers not only of the club but of Primera División. During his ten years in the team, Tarasconi played 226 official matches, scoring 186 goals. He also won 9 titles with Boca Juniors.

He scored 7 goals in the successful 1925 tour to Europe being the 2nd scorer of the tour behind Manuel Seoane. He was also top scorer of Primera División in 1922, 1923, 1924, and 1927.

After Tarasconi left Boca Juniors in 1932 there are no records of any match played by him until 1934 where he joinded Sportivo Barracas, which played in the official association (AFA) that remained amateur opposed to dissident Liga Argentina de Football (LAF), the first professional league in the country. Tarasconi only played 6 matches there with no goals scored before moving to 	General San Martín , where he played 20 matches with 16 goals within the same season.

In 1935 Tarasconi moved to Sportivo Barracas, finishing his career in Argentinos Juniors, where he played 8 matches in the 1936 season before retiring from the activity.

Tarasconi won 9 titles with Boca Juniors and two Copa América with the Argentina national team. He played 24 games for Argentina, netting 18 goals between 1922 and 1929. He also played in the 1928 Olympic games where he finished as tournament top scorer. Tarasconi is still the 13th highest scoring player in the history of the Argentina national football team.

Titles

Boca Juniors 
 Primera División (5): 1923, 1924, 1926, 1930, 1931 LAF
 Copa Ibarguren (2): 1923, 1924
 Copa Competencia Jockey Club (1): 1925
 Copa Estímulo (1): 1926

Argentina 
 Copa América (2): 1925, 1929
 Summer Olympics (1): 1928 Silver Medal

Individual
 Topscorer: 
 1928 Summer Olympics (11 goals)
 Primera División: 1922, 1923, 1924, 1927, 1934

In popular culture 

Tango singer and legend Carlos Gardel performed the song Patadura, a humorous tango released in 1928 that used football as a metaphor to describe to ineptitude of the person described in the song. The word patadura is a local term currently used to describe a person with no skills to play football.

The song (with lyrics by Enrique Carreras Sotelo and music by José López Ares) named Tarasconi (calling him by his nickname Tarasca) "to score a goal from the middle of the field", referring to Tarasconi's strong shot and accuracy. Other notable footballers of those times mentioned in the song are Manuel Seoane, Luis Monti, Pedro Ochoa (who was also friend of Gardel, who composed the tango Ochoíta in his honor).

Gardel then recorded a new version of Patadura in 1929 in Paris, where the lyrics where slightly changed replacing the original Argentine footballers by players of FC Barcelona (Vicente Piera, Ricardo Zamora, Josep Samitier, Franz Platko) with whom Gardel had established a friendship (especially with Samitier) apart of becoming a fan of the team. Gardel was also honorary member of the club, having attended some matches such as the 1928 Copa del Rey Final.

Notes

References

External links

 Patadura (tango) lyrics on Hermano Tango

1903 births
1991 deaths
Argentine footballers
Argentina international footballers
Association football forwards
Club Atlético Atlanta footballers
Boca Juniors footballers
Newell's Old Boys footballers
Argentinos Juniors footballers
Argentine Primera División players
Olympic footballers of Argentina
Argentine people of Italian descent
Footballers at the 1928 Summer Olympics
Olympic silver medalists for Argentina
Medalists at the 1928 Summer Olympics
Footballers from Buenos Aires
Olympic medalists in football
Burials at La Chacarita Cemetery
Copa América-winning players